Deh-e Mirza Khan-e Bar Ahuyi (also Romanized as Deh-e Mīrzā Khān-e Bar Āhūyī; also known as Deh-e Mīrzā Khān-e Barāvī) is a village in Margan Rural District, in the Central District of Hirmand County, Sistan and Baluchestan Province, Iran. At the 2006 census, its population was 109, in 22 families.

References 

Populated places in Hirmand County